Hayley Crofts (born 23 September 1988 in Invercargill, New Zealand) is a New Zealand netball player. In 2008, she was signed to play for the Central Pulse in the ANZ Championship. Much of the team was replaced after a winless 2008 season, with Crofts not being re-signed for the 2009 season. The following year, she signed with the Canterbury Tactix for the 2010 season.

References

External links
2010 ANZ Championship profile

New Zealand netball players
Mainland Tactix players
Central Pulse players
1988 births
Living people
ANZ Championship players
National Netball League (New Zealand) players